Anti-Clock is a 1979 science fiction film written and directed by Jane Arden and co-directed by Jack Bond. In the film, dreams are imaged in computerized video.

The film, which stars Arden's son Sebastian Saville, was shot on film and video in colour with black and white sequences. It opened the 1979 London Film Festival, but was never picked up for British distribution: its only other public British screening was at the National Film Theatre in 1983 as a tribute to Jane Arden, who committed suicide at the end of the previous year. However, it had a modest theatrical release in the US, where it received considerable critical acclaim.  Famed scientist Richard Feynman appears in the form of stock footage from his Messenger lectures on "The Character of Physical Law", and is credited as "The Physicist".

Anti-Clock, which relates closely in places to Jane Arden's book You Don't Know What You Want, Do You? was restored by the British Film Institute for DVD and Blu-ray and released on 13 July 2009.

References

External links
 

1979 films
1970s science fiction films
Films directed by Jane Arden
Films directed by Jack Bond
British science fiction films
1970s English-language films
1970s British films